Guishan Lingyou (Japanese: Isan Reiyu) (771–853) was a Chinese Chan master during the Tang Dynasty and the founder of the Guiyang school.

Life

771: born under the secular surname Zhao, born in Changxi, Fujian province
785: became a Buddhist monk at age 15, received tonsure ceremony at Shanjian Temple in Fujian, received the monastic precepts at Longxing Temple in Hangzhou where he studied sutra and Vinaya Pitaka.
793: at age 23, followed Zen Master Baizhang Huaihai, as his dharma heir disciple
820: became the abbot of Tongqing Temple in Guishan, Hunan Province. Master Lingyou trained many disciples, included Yangshan Huiji (813 - 890), his dharma heir. The Guiyang school was named after master Guishan Lingyou and his disciple, Yangshan Huiji.
853: died at age 83

References

 『宋高僧伝』巻11「唐大潙山霊祐伝」
 『景徳傳燈録』巻9「潭州潙山霊祐禅師」

External links
Painting of Zen Master Guishan Lingyou
 

Zen Buddhist spiritual teachers
771 births
853 deaths